Bucculatrix seneciensis is a moth in the family Bucculatricidae. It is found in North America, where it has been recorded from California. It was described by Annette Frances Braun in 1963.

Adults have been recorded on wing in November.

The larvae feed on Senecio species. They probably bore the stem of their host plant.

References

Natural History Museum Lepidoptera generic names catalog

Bucculatricidae
Moths described in 1963
Moths of North America
Taxa named by Annette Frances Braun